Lóegaire (Laoghaire, Láegaire, Loeguire, sometimes anglicised as Leary) is a popular medieval Irish given name borne by a number of historical and legendary figures.

People 

Notable people bearing this name include:
 Lóegaire Lorc, legendary High King of Ireland of the 6th century BC
 Lóegaire Búadach, hapless would-be hero of the Ulster Cycle
 Lóegaire mac Néill, High King of Ireland in the time of Saint Patrick
 Lughaid mac Loeguire, another High King of Ireland

Fictional characters 
 Laoghaire MacKenzie, a character in the Outlander series of novels

Other
In south county Dublin there is the town of Dún Laoghaire, meaning "The Fort of Leary."